Treat Myself is the third major-label studio album by American singer-songwriter Meghan Trainor, released on January 31, 2020. Trainor worked with producers including Mike Sabath, Tyler Johnson and Ojivolta, and co-wrote songs with her brothers Ryan and Justin Trainor and British singer Frances, among others, to create the album. Artists who are featured on the album include Sabath, Nicki Minaj, Lennon Stella, Sasha Alex Sloan, The Pussycat Dolls and AJ Mitchell. Musically, Treat Myself was Trainor's attempt to create a pop record that feels relevant in an era when hip-hop reigns.

Initially slated for release in August 2018, preceded by the singles "No Excuses", "Let You Be Right" and "Can't Dance", the album's release was delayed as Trainor wanted to add more songs to it. Of the aforementioned singles, the final version of the album includes only "No Excuses", which peaked at number 46 on the Billboard Hot 100, spending a total of 12 weeks on the chart. It was certified platinum in the United States for sales of over one million units. Two new singles, "Wave" and "Nice to Meet Ya", were released as the second and third single respectively, with the latter peaking at number 89 on the Hot 100, becoming Trainor's tenth entry on the chart.

Treat Myself was released to mixed reviews from critics, with some opining that its quality was worth the delay while others criticized the lyrical content. The album was a commercial underperformance, debuting at number 25 on the US Billboard 200 and spent only three weeks on the chart. The album additionally reached the top 30 in Australia, Canada, Spain and Switzerland. Trainor promoted Treat Myself through a series of public appearances and televised live performances. A deluxe version of the album was released on July 17, 2020, preceded by the single "Make You Dance".

Background and release
In a March 2018 interview, Meghan Trainor described her forthcoming third major-label studio album as her "best work yet", revealing that her family members would provide background vocals on every track and teasing "Treat Myself" as a potential song title. Following the release of several singles, Trainor confirmed Treat Myself as the album's title on June 19, 2018. Its pre-order went up the following day. She delayed releasing Treat Myself for an undefined period in August 2018, saying that she was in "such an amazing place" and could not "stop writing songs". In November 2018, Trainor said that she had worked with Sasha Sloan and Lennon Stella on a track for the album titled "Working On It", which she called "about loving yourself and just trying".

In February 2019, Trainor announced the release of an EP called The Love Train, describing it as "something of an appetizer" to Treat Myself. Her reasoning was that her father had told her there were "way too many love songs" on the album, which led her to put them out as a separate project. On November 6, 2019, she announced the release date for Treat Myself as January 31, 2020, on The Ellen DeGeneres Show and shared the official artwork on social media later that day. Billboard confirmed that "Workin' on It" had made the final cut for the album. Trainor said in a January 2020 interview that she had written four albums worth of material trying to adapt to new trends in the music industry. A deluxe version of the album, with three new tracks and acoustic versions of two standard edition tracks, was released on July 17, 2020.

"Genetics" features the American girl group the Pussycat Dolls who reformed in 2019. Trainor revealed the collaboration came about when she bumped into Nicole Scherzinger whilst both artists were filming The Four and The Masked Singer respectively. Trainor sent the song to Scherzinger who liked it, and the pair agreed to collaborate on the song. At the time, The Dolls' reunion was not confirmed, so Scherzinger recorded the vocals for the group's part. Trainor elaborated in an interview with Billboard, saying that "she was saving ["Genetics"] for her album, and if it's true that they are coming back together, we can put 'Pussycat Dolls in the credits. Trainor had previous connections to the group, having sampled Pussycat Dolls' member Ashley Roberts' song "Woman Up" for her own song of the same name included on her second major-label studio album Thank You (2016).

Inspiration

When asked about her inspiration for Treat Myself in a March 2018 interview, Trainor said that she missed pop songs that were "big anthems", citing "Stronger" (2000) by Britney Spears as an example. She also revealed she was listening to a lot of ABBA's music, hoping to create a big pop song that is "actually kind of vulnerable". In May 2018, Trainor said that the album had developed into "fun, dance-y stuff with a little funk" and had an '80s and '90s feel, reiterating she wanted to bring Spears, NSYNC and Backstreet Boys-inspired pop songs back to radio.

Trainor released several love songs that were originally part of Treat Myself on her second EP, The Love Train. She said of the songs that were left on the album: "This is what I want my music to sound like and these are the songs I love. I don't care what's playing on the radio or what they don't accept. I love this, and I'm proud to perform these songs". In January 2020, having changed musical direction, Trainor described the new version of Treat Myself as her attempt to adapt to "what's going on in the music industry", wanting to answer the question: "[H]ow do you make pop records that feel relevant in an era when hip-hop reigns?" She kept writing "the best songs [she] could", until Epic Records and Trainor agreed that she could not "beat these songs".

Composition
Treat Myself has been described as pop, doo-wop, funk, and R&B. It makes use of club-ready dance rhythms, contemporary R&B hooks, screwdriver bass lines, shimmery synths, and bright vocal overdubs. According to AllMusic's Matt Collar, Trainor fully engages the "slick, hip-hop-infused funk" musical styling of Bruno Mars on Treat Myself. The record consists of some "irresistible bops" alongside mature love songs according to Mike Nied of Idolator. With a number of ballads on the tracklist, the sonic choices include the use of a coconut opener as an instrument, a children's choir, and funk and EDM-influenced production. Lyrically exploring the theme of female duplicity, the album features "the same girl gang hoots and hollers and fluffernutter hooks" as Trainor's previous two full-length albums according to PopMatters Jessica Brant.

The album opens with "Wave", an electropop and house song,  featuring Mike Sabath, whose lyrics detail the highs and lows of a dramatic love story. "Nice to Meet Ya", featuring Nicki Minaj, is a pop and R&B song with a chorus whispered by Trainor and a "characteristically confident" verse by Minaj. The third track, "Funk", is a funk-influenced pop song with brass licks, spoken-word breakdowns and lyrical innuendos. "Babygirl", which has been called a mission statement for the album, has been described as a "glitchy, throbbing wail" with a chorus that includes a scream: "Love yourself! Love yourself! Love yourself! Love yourself! AHHH". The fifth track, "Workin' on It", featuring Lennon Stella and Sasha Sloan, is an intimately written song about the singer's struggles with self-acceptance.

"Ashes" is an emotional breakup song that finds Trainor moving on from a strained relationship. On the seventh track, "Lie to Me", the singer pleads with a former partner for a second chance, and if that is impossible, she asks him to lie. On "Here to Stay", Trainor celebrates the consistency of being in a committed relationship. Nied wrote that there is "something undeniably sweet about the hidden delight". "Blink" sees her sing about her newfound confidence over dubstep-inspired production. It was described as a "motivational anthem" by Claire Shaffer of Rolling Stone. On the 10th track "Genetics", featuring the Pussycat Dolls, Trainor sings "how you get that bod? Is it from God?", and spells out the song title like a Eugenics cheerleader.

"Evil Twin" is an electropop song where the singer "apologizes for—and embraces—her wild side, or her 'evil twin, according to Shaffer. "After You", featuring AJ Mitchell, is a ballad whose lyrics serve as a tribute to never-ending love. "Another Opinion" takes a "classier approach" at addressing Trainor's haters, with a production of laid back beats and ukulele instrumentation. The 14th track, and lead single, "No Excuses" is a pop song with country influences. The standard edition of Treat Myself closes with "Have You Now", which was described as a sugary love song and "candy-coated delight". "All the Ways" was described as a perky pop song, whereas the title track was called a "bass-driven, fun-loving song that is the perfect soundtrack to any night out" and a "shimmering tune".

"Make You Dance" has funky disco vibes and a bass drop. With lyrics inspired by the ongoing COVID-19 pandemic, Trainor admits the negative habits she has picked up since the resultant lockdowns began, including drinking at 1 and staying awake all night to watch videos on her phone. The deluxe edition of the album closes with the tracks "Underwater", featuring Dillon Francis, and "You Don't Know Me". Wass described the former as a "floorfiller" and noted that Trainor "exudes attitude" on the latter, which he called "feisty".

Promotion
Trainor promoted Treat Myself with a series of public appearances and televised live performances. In 2018, she performed "No Excuses" on The Ellen DeGeneres Show, The Tonight Show Starring Jimmy Fallon, The Today Show and the 2018 iHeartRadio MMVAs. She also performed the song on Sounds Like Friday Night and the Sport Relief telethon on BBC One that year. On September 13, 2019, Trainor performed it and "After You" as part of her setlist on The Today Shows Citi concert series. Trainor and Sabath performed "Wave" for the first time, on The Ellen DeGeneres Show, on November 6, 2019. They also performed the song on The Voice on December 3, 2019. Trainor performed "Blink" for the first time at the American Heart Association's Go Red For Women Red Dress Collection fashion show on February 5, 2020. The next day, she performed "Nice to Meet Ya" on The Tonight Show Starring Jimmy Fallon. On April 10, 2020, the singer performed a stripped-back version of "Wave" as part of her Billboard Live At Home concert. On April 13, she performed "Ashes" for the first time as part of her Together At Home virtual concert series, in association with the Global Citizen Festival. Trainor performed "Wave" on April 24 for iHeartRadio's First Responder Fridays.

Singles
"No Excuses" was released as the album's lead single on March 1, 2018. The song debuted at its peak, number 46, on the US Billboard Hot 100, spending a total of 12 weeks on the chart. It was certified platinum in the United States for sales of over one million units. She followed this up by releasing "Let You Be Right" and "Can't Dance" as singles in May 2018. "Wave", featuring Mike Sabath, was released as a single on September 27, 2019. In November 2019, Billboard reported that Trainor had scrapped everything released between "No Excuses" and "Wave" from Treat Myself, with those serving as the first two singles from the album. On January 22, 2020, Trainor announced in an Instagram live story that the second track on the album, entitled "Nice to Meet Ya", featuring Nicki Minaj, would be released as the third single along with the album release on January 31, 2020. "Make You Dance", from the album's deluxe edition, was released as a single on July 10, 2020.

Promotional singles
A number of songs were released as promotional singles from Treat Myself. "All the Ways" was released on June 21, 2018, followed by the title track on July 20, 2018. A solo version of "Genetics" was released on September 13, 2019, and "Workin' on It", featuring Lennon Stella and Sasha Sloan, on November 6, 2019. "Evil Twin" was released on December 13, 2019, followed by "Blink" as the final promotional single on January 17, 2020.

Critical reception

Treat Myself received mixed reviews from critics. At Metacritic, which assigns a normalized rating out of 100 to reviews from mainstream critics, the album has an average score of 51 out of 100, which indicates "Mixed or Average reviews" based on 4 reviews. Idolator's Mike Nied called it an "exciting listen", adding that the album effectively showcases Trainor's creative range, "deserves respect and was well-worth the wait". Lauren Alvarez of Forbes described the album as "a spectacular showcase of Trainor's talent, lyricism and overall range", agreeing that the project was worth the wait. AllMusic writer Matt Collar said that with it, Trainor "continues to evolve her sound", but it lacks some of the effortless charm of her debut major-label studio album, Title (2015). He added that she employs a sophisticated production style that "sometimes threatens to lose her in the mix", but "there are plenty of fun moments".

According to Russ Coffey of The Arts Desk, Trainor is "at her finest when she's kept some of her cheeky, girl-next-door charm", and despite its inconsistencies, Treat Myself does exactly that. Writing for PopMatters, Jessica Brant stated that the album caves under the pressure of entertainment industry feminism, and delivers "the usual lip service branding agencies employ to beef up the portfolios of their sexy, feminine clientele". NMEs Hannah Mylrea called it a "frustrating listen", adding that it is "sickly sweet and filled with cliché lyrics", describing it as "a lesson in saccharine theatrics stuffed full of insipid songs". Dani Blum of Pitchfork was critical of Treat Myself, saying that it "tries to be all things to all people", and referring to it as "a sonic overload that bludgeons the listener with bastardized 'empowerment". Daniel Bromfield of Spectrum Culture stated, "there's always something a little off about this album. When Trainor simpers in harmony with the album's two male guests...it's like those scenes in Blue Velvet where everyone talks in unnatural white-bread clichés".

Commercial performance
In the United States, Treat Myself debuted at number 25 on the US Billboard 200. It debuted at number 25 on the Canadian Albums Chart. Treat Myself charted at number 27 in Spain, number 28 in Switzerland, number 40 in Scotland and at numbers 41 and 58 in the United Kingdom and Ireland. It reached number 13 in Australia and number 40 in New Zealand.

Track listing
Credits adapted from the album's liner notesNotes  signifies an additional producer
  signifies a vocal producer

 Personnel 
Credits adapted from the album's liner notes.Recording locationsRecorded and engineered at Mike Sabath Home Studio (tracks 1 and 15), The Train Station (tracks 2–4, 6–8, 12 and 15), EastWest Studios (Hollywood) (tracks 5 and 10–14), Dan Gleyzer Home Studio (track 6), Brickboi Studios (Los Angeles) (track 7), Black Star Studio (track 9), The Cave (Nashville, Tennessee) (tracks 12–13) and Some Random Studio (track 15)
Mixed at MixStar Studios (Virginia Beach, Virginia) (tracks 1, 3, 5 and 9-15), Jon Castelli Studio (tracks 2 and 6–8) and Mike Sabath Home Studio (track 4)
Mastered at Sterling Sound (New York City) (tracks 1 and 3-15) and Becker Mastering (track 2)
Management – Jeffrey Azoff, Tommy Bruce and Sali Kharazi, Full Stop Management
Legal – Aaron Rosenberg, Josh Karp and Haley Golding, Myman GreenspanPersonnel'

Meghan Trainor – lead vocals, background vocals, executive producer, claps, synthesizer (tracks 1 and 13), ukulele (track 13)
Mike Sabath – featured vocals, production, background vocals, recording, engineering, mixing, bass (tracks 1, 4 and 15), drums (tracks 1 and 3–4), synthesizer (tracks 1 and 3), mellotron (track 4), piano (tracks 4 and 15), guitar (track 15)
Ojivolta – production, engineering, programming, recording
King Henry – production, recording, guitar (track 5)
Dan Gleyzer – production, recording, engineering
Zach Skelton – production, engineering
Sigala – production, recording
Tyler Johnson – production, drum programming, background vocals, recording, claps, keyboards (tracks 12–13), piano (tracks 12–13), synthesizer (track 13)
Andrew Wells – production, drum programming, recording, engineering, guitar (tracks 11 and 14), bass (tracks 11 and 14), synthesizer (tracks 11 and 14)
Whethan – production, drum programming, engineering, synthesizer (track 11)
Jon Castelli – production, mixing, drum programming
Some Randoms – production, programming, recording, instrumentation, keyboards (track 15)
Nicki Minaj – featured vocals, background vocals
Lennon Stella – featured vocals
Sasha Sloan – featured vocals
Nicole Scherzinger – featured vocals, background vocals
AJ Mitchell – featured vocals
Camila Viola – background vocals
Daryl Sabara – background vocals, claps
Jordan Federman – background vocals, claps, tambourine (track 3)
Ryan Trainor – background vocals, scream, claps
Mark Williams – background vocals
Justin Trainor – background vocals, engineering, recording, vocal production
Eddie Benjamin – background vocals, bass (track 3), synthesizer (track 3), guitar (track 8), bass (track 8)
Tristan Hurd – background vocals, trumpet (track 3)
Theodore (Caye) Tittman – background vocals
Frances – background vocals
Peter Aiden Miller – background vocals
Josh Kear – background vocals
Kelli Trainor – background vocals
Sam Berger – background vocals
Christopher Lynch – background vocals
Gary Trainor – background vocals
Jacob Kasher – background vocals
Aubry "Big Juice" Delaine – recording
Matt Wallach – engineering, background vocals
Mark Parfitt – engineering
Bo Bodnar – engineering, background vocals
Brendan Dekora – engineering
Danny Klein – engineering
Matt Campfield – engineering
Jonas Jalhay – programming, recording, guitar (track 14)
Maurice Ellis – bass (track 11)
Anders Mouridsen – electric guitar (track 11), piano (track 12), keyboards (track 12), guitar (track 12)
Drew Taubenfeld – guitar (track 11)
Ron Schaer – trumpet (track 11)
Dan Higgins – saxophone (track 11)
The Vultures – string arrangement, sound design
Nick Lobel – drum programming, engineering
Tommy Bruce – claps
Nathaniel Cochrane – claps
Serban Ghenea – mixing
John Hanes – mixing
Ingmar Carlson – mixing
Randy Merrill – mastering
Dale Becker – mastering
Charm Ladonna – creative director
Gavin Taylor – album cover design
Hanna Hillier – photography
Hayley Atkin – styling
Dimitris Giannetos – hair
Alison Christian – makeup

Charts

References

External links
 

2020 albums
Meghan Trainor albums
Albums produced by King Henry (producer)
Albums produced by Meghan Trainor
Albums produced by Mike Sabath
Albums produced by Sigala
Albums produced by Tyler Johnson (musician)
Epic Records albums
Funk albums by American artists